Neocoridolon borgmeieri is a species of beetle in the family Cerambycidae, the only species in the genus Neocoridolon.

References

Callidiopini
Monotypic beetle genera